The 2014 Città di Vercelli – Trofeo Multimed was a professional tennis tournament played on clay courts. It was the first edition of the tournament which was part of the 2014 ATP Challenger Tour. It took place in Vercelli, Italy between 21 and 27 April 2014.

Singles main-draw entrants

Seeds

Other entrants
The following players received wildcards into the singles main draw:
  Matteo Donati
  Stefano Napolitano
  Stefano Travaglia
  Simone Bolelli

The following players received entry from the qualifying draw:
  Federico Gaio
  Nicolas Reissig
  Mate Delić
  Kyle Edmund

Doubles main-draw entrants

Seeds

Other entrants
The following pairs received wildcards into the doubles main draw:
  Alberto Bagarello /  Alberto Giraudo
  Pietro Rondoni /  Stefano Travaglia
  Matteo Donati /  Stefano Napolitano

Champions

Singles

  Simone Bolelli def.  Mate Delić, 6–2, 6–2

Doubles

 Matteo Donati /  Stefano Napolitano def.  Pierre-Hugues Herbert /  Albano Olivetti, 7–6(7–2), 6–3

External links

Citta di Vercelli - Trofeo Multimed
Città di Vercelli – Trofeo Multimed